Paraense Transportes Aéreos was a Brazilian airline founded in 1952. It ceased operations in 1970.

History 

Paraense Transportes Aéreos was a Brazilian airline which was founded on February 18, 1952 by Antônio Alves Affonso Ramos Junior and made its maiden flight on March 30 of the same year, using a Consolidated PBY-5A Catalina.

Regular passenger and cargo flights started in 1957 using a Curtiss C-46 to fly from Belém to Rio de Janeiro via Pedro Afonso, Cristalândia and Brasília. In fact, Paraense was one of the first airlines to have regular services to Brasília, the new Brazilian capital, inaugurated in 1960. In 1960 it started the route São Paulo, Cuiabá, Porto Velho, Rio Branco.

It had serious maintenance problems and after a series of accidents, particularly the one of March 14, 1970, all aircraft were grounded. On May 29, 1970, Paraense ceased operations.

Fleet

Accidents and incidents 
Accidents involving fatalities

31 May 1958: a cargo Curtiss C-46D-15-CU Commando registration PP-BTB crashed shortly after take-off from Rio de Janeiro-Santos Dumont of unknown causes. The crew of 4 died.
6 May 1959: a Curtiss C-46/Super C-46 Commando registration PP-BTA crashed shortly after take-off from Belém-Val de Cans. Three crew members died.
22 September 1960: a Curtiss C-46/Super C-46 Commando registration PP-BTF crashed shortly after take-off from Belém-Val de Cans. Seven occupants died.
12 August 1965: a Curtiss C-46A-50-CU Commando registration PP-BTH en route to Cuiabá caught fire and crashed on the location of Buracão, close do Barra do Bugre, in the State of Mato Grosso. All 13 passengers and crew died.
27 March 1968: Douglas C-47A PP-BTX was damaged beyond economic repair at an unknown location in Brazil.
14 March 1970: a Fairchild Hiller FH-227B registration PP-BUF operating flight 903 from São Luiz to Belém-Val de Cans, while on final approach to land, crashed into Guajará Bay. Of the 40 passengers and crew, 3 survived.

See also 
List of defunct airlines of Brazil

References

External links 
Paraense Accidents as per Aviation Safety Database

Defunct airlines of Brazil
Airlines established in 1952
Airlines disestablished in 1970
Defunct seaplane operators